Dai Dengwen (born 15 December 1976) is a Chinese speed skater. He competed in two events at the 1998 Winter Olympics.

References

1976 births
Living people
Chinese male speed skaters
Olympic speed skaters of China
Speed skaters at the 1998 Winter Olympics
Place of birth missing (living people)
20th-century Chinese people